Zoltán Kiss (born 12 July 1986) is a Hungarian former footballer who played as a defender.

External links
 Profile 
 Futball-adattar 

1986 births
Sportspeople from Nógrád County
Living people
Hungarian footballers
Hungary youth international footballers
Association football defenders
Újpest FC players
FC Sopron players
Szolnoki MÁV FC footballers
Nyíregyháza Spartacus FC players
Békéscsaba 1912 Előre footballers
BFC Siófok players
Nemzeti Bajnokság I players
Nemzeti Bajnokság II players
Austrian Regionalliga players
Hungarian expatriate footballers
Expatriate footballers in Austria
Hungarian expatriate sportspeople in Austria